The 2015 Six Nations Under 20s Championship was a rugby union competition held between February and March 2015. England won the championship. However, no team won either a Grand Slam or the Triple Crown.

Final table

Results

Round 1

Round 2

Round 3

Round 4

Round 5

References

2015
2015 rugby union tournaments for national teams
2014–15 in English rugby union
2014–15 in French rugby union
2014–15 in Irish rugby union
2014–15 in Welsh rugby union
2014–15 in Scottish rugby union
2014–15 in Italian rugby union
U-20
February 2015 sports events in Europe
March 2015 sports events in Europe